J. T. Howe may refer to:
John T. Howe (engineer), American engineer
John T. Howe (politician), North Carolina legislator